Mitchell Gino Brogdon Sr.  is an American judge and television personality. He was the presiding judge of the court show, Personal Injury Court, and the father of Boston Celtics  guard Malcolm Brogdon.

Career

Brogdon earned his Bachelor of Arts from Oberlin College in 1983. He then earned his Juris Doctor from Indiana University in 1986. Brogdon became a member of the State Bar of Georgia  and the American Bar Association in 1987.

He was a legal analyst for CNN and is a mediator with Henning Mediation & Arbitration Services.

In 2019, he became the host of the American daytime reality court show, Personal Injury Court.
The show featured acted cases involving personal injury.

References

External links 
 

Living people
1962 births
Television judges